The Luff Award  is awarded by the American Philatelic Society (commonly known as the APS) for meritorious contributions to philately by living philatelists.

Established
The award was established in 1940 in memory of John N. Luff, distinguished philatelist and president of the APS from 1907 to 1909.

Basis of the award
The recipient of the award must be a living philatelist. Three Luff Awards are usually presented each year – one each for:
 distinguished philatelic research
 exceptional contributions to philately
 outstanding service to the American Philatelic Society

Honorees
Luff Awards were presented by the society, starting in 1940 and continuing to this day. During some years, awards were not presented for various reasons.

External links
 Luff Award
 Luff Award Winners

Philatelic awards
Awards established in 1940